The 2002 Grand Prix motorcycle racing season was the 54th Fédération Internationale de Motocyclisme (FIM) Road Racing World Championship season. The season consist of 16 races, which started with the Japanese Grand Prix on 7 April and ended with the Valencian Community Grand Prix on 3 November.

The premier class, now renamed MotoGP, introduced new rules and regulations which allowed 990cc four-stroke bikes to race alongside the previous year's 500cc two-stroke bikes. Defending champion Valentino Rossi won his second premier class title by winning 11 races and scoring 355 points. He clinched the title at the Rio de Janeiro Grand Prix, with four races left in the season.

The 250cc title was won by Marco Melandri who won nine races and scored 298 points. He clinched the title at the Australian Grand Prix and became the youngest ever champion in the 250cc class. Arnaud Vincent won the 125cc title by 19 points difference over defending champion Manuel Poggiali. The title was decided in the last race of the season at Valencia with Vincent finishing in second place to secure the title.

Season summary

MotoGP class

The season marked the start of a new era in the premier class with the arrival of 990cc four-stroke bikes. Four factory teams, Repsol Honda, Marlboro Yamaha, Suzuki and Aprilia, raced with the new four-stroke bikes while all the satellite teams raced with the 500cc two-stroke bike. The season also marked the return of Dunlop and the entry of Bridgestone to the premier class. Dunlop supplied the tyres for Suzuki, Aprilia, Yamaha WCM and Pramac Honda. Bridgestone supplied the tyres for Team Roberts and Kanemoto Racing. Michelin supplied the tyres for the remaining six teams. However, after only two races, Suzuki switched back to Michelin tyres for the remainder of the season.

Valentino Rossi, riding the four-stroke Honda RC211V bike, won the first race of the season at Suzuka under wet conditions. Suzuki's test rider Akira Ryō, who raced as a wildcard entry, and Yamaha's Carlos Checa completed the all four-stroke podium. Rossi's teammate, Tohru Ukawa, won the second race before Rossi went on to dominate the championship by winning seven consecutive races. Max Biaggi handed the four-stroke Yamaha YZR-M1 its first win in the Czech Republic Grand Prix at Brno, while Rossi had to retire due to tyre problems. In that race, Honda also expanded their four-stroke presence by providing the RC211V bike for Honda Gresini rider Daijiro Kato. Rossi then won two consecutive races in Portugal and Brazil, clinching the world championship in the latter.

In the Pacific Grand Prix, Honda Pons rider Alex Barros won his first race riding the RC211V bike. In that race, Kawasaki returned to the world championship after 20 years absence. Kawasaki, with their four-stroke Ninja ZX-RR, raced as wildcards in the last four races of the season as a preparation before entering the championship full-time in the following season. In the following race at Sepang, Yamaha expanded their four-stroke presence by providing the YZR-M1 bikes to Tech 3 pair Olivier Jacque and Shinya Nakano. Another Yamaha rider, Norifumi Abe, raced the fifth YZR-M1 on the grid for the last two races of the season.

Rossi ended the season with 355 points from 11 wins and four second places. Biaggi finished second to Rossi with 215 points and two race wins. Ukawa and Barros completed the top four with 209 and 204 points respectively. Previous year's 250cc champion Daijiro Kato finished in seventh position with two podium finishes and was named as the Rookie of the Year. All races were won by the four-stroke bikes, while the two-strokes only managed to record five podiums finishes. Honda won the constructors championship with 390 points and 14 wins, followed by Yamaha who won the other two races. Repsol Honda team won the teams championship by winning 12 races and scoring 564 points from Rossi and Ukawa. Marlboro Yamaha and Honda Pons who won two races each was second and third respectively.

250cc class

The 250cc class was certain to have a new champion as previous year's champion Daijiro Kato and 1993 champion Tetsuya Harada, who finished second to Kato last year, both moved up to the MotoGP class. Only three riders remained from previous year's top six: Marco Melandri, Roberto Rolfo and Fonsi Nieto. Melandri was the only rider in the 250cc class who has previously won a 250cc race; he won his first and only race in the 2001 German Grand Prix. The 250cc entry list also included three former 125cc World Champion: Haruchika Aoki, Roberto Locatelli and Emilio Alzamora.

The season started with a wet race at Suzuka which was won by Japanese wildcard rider Osamu Miyazaki, who was riding for Daytona Yamaha team. Honda's wildcard rider Daisaku Sakai and Aprilia's Randy de Puniet completed the podium. In the following race at Welkom, Aprilia's Marco Melandri took his second career 250cc win. Fonsi Nieto then took his first ever race win in the Spanish Grand Prix. Nieto also took the lead in the championship standings from de Puniet and Franco Battaini. Nieto then won the following race at Le Mans before Melandri won the next three races and overtook the championship lead from Nieto after the Dutch TT. Melandri continued his streak to six consecutive wins and extended his lead in the standings to 37 points after the Czech Republic Grand Prix.

Nieto won the Portuguese Grand Prix for Aprilia's tenth consecutive victory. Nieto, who crashed in lap 13, recovered from seventh position to win the rain-soaked race over Melandri. Aprilia's winning streak was broken when Yamaha's Sebastián Porto won the Rio de Janeiro Grand Prix under wet race condition. Rookie Toni Elías won the following race at Motegi after a last-lap battle with Melandri. Melandri finished second and increase his lead over Nieto in the championship standings to 52 points. With 52 points lead and three races to go, Melandri only need to finish in front of Nieto in the Malaysian Grand Prix to clinch the championship. However, he suffered a mechanical failure on the first lap, while Nieto won the race to reduce the gap to 27 points. Melandri finally clinched the 250cc title in the Australian Grand Prix with a close win over Nieto. They fought until the last lap and Melandri won the race with just 0.007 second gap at the finish line. Melandri became the youngest 250cc world champion at the age of 20 years and 74 days.

Melandri ended the season with 298 points from nine race wins, three second-place finishes and one fourth-place finish. Nieto finished second in the standings with 241 points and four wins, followed Honda's Roberto Rolfo and rookie Toni Elías with 219 and 178 points respectively. Elías, who recorded one race win and four further podium finishes, was named as the Rookie of the Year. Aprilia won the constructors championship with 382 points and 14 race wins from Melandri, Nieto and Elías. Honda finished second in the standings with 244 points but failed to record any race win. Yamaha, who won two races courtesy of Miyazaki and Porto's wins in the wet, finished third with 211 points.

125cc class

The 125cc entry list was headlined by defending champion Manuel Poggiali and two-time championship runners-up Youichi Ui and Noboru Ueda. There were five other riders who have previously won a 125cc race: Masao Azuma, Lucio Cecchinello, Stefano Perugini, Simone Sanna and Arnaud Vincent.

Arnaud Vincent, who returned to Aprilia after a year with Honda, won the opening race at Suzuka under wet condition. He then extended his lead in the championship with two second places in the second and third race behind Manuel Poggiali and Lucio Cecchinello respectively. In the following race at Le Mans, Cecchinello won his second successive race ahead of Poggiali, while Vincent finished fourth. Poggiali then took over the championship lead from Vincent after winning the Italian Grand Prix. Poggiali won the following race at Catalunya with a late overtake at the finish line over Spanish teenager Daniel Pedrosa. Two weeks later, Pedrosa bounced back to win his first ever race in the 2002 Dutch TT, with Poggiali finishing in second place.

Vincent, who led the championship in the first four races, returned to the top of the podium with two consecutive wins at Donington Park and Sachsenring. After finishing third behind Cecchinello and Pedrosa at Brno, Vincent won the wet Portuguese Grand Prix and retook the championship lead from Poggiali. Honda riders, Masao Azuma and Pedrosa, won the following two races at Rio de Janeiro and Motegi while Poggiali reduced Vincent's lead to just eight points courtesy of two podium finishes and Vincent's mechanical problem at Motegi. Vincent extended his lead by winning the Malaysian Grand Prix while Poggiali finished in fourth. However, Poggiali won the following race at Phillip Island while Vincent finished in fourth to reduce the lead back to eight points. In the last race of the season at Valencia, Vincent finished second behind Pedrosa to clinch the 125cc title while Poggiali finished in seventh place.

Vincent ended the season with 273 points and five race wins, 19 points ahead of defending champion Poggiali who scored 254 points and four race wins. Pedrosa and Cecchinello finished third and fourth in the standings with three wins each. The Rookie of the Year title was won by Finnish rider Mika Kallio who scored 78 points with the Red Devil Honda team. Aprilia won the constructors championship with 341 points and eight race wins from Vincent and Cecchinello. Honda finished second in the standings with 285 points and four wins from Pedrosa and Azuma while Gilera finished third with 254 points and three wins from Poggiali.

2002 Grand Prix season calendar
On 18 October 2001, the FIM confirmed the 2002 calendar. On 4 December 2001, the FIM confirmed that the dates of the Rio and Valencian Community Grands Prix had swapped places.

The following sixteen Grands Prix were scheduled to take place:

 †† = Saturday race

Calendar changes
 The Malaysian and Australian Grand Prix swapped places. The Malaysian round became the 14th round, while the Australian round became the 15th round on the calendar.
 The Valencian Community Grand Prix swapped position with the Rio Grand Prix. The Valencian round became the last race of the season as the world championship returned to Europe after four flyaway races that started with Rio Grand Prix.

Regulation changes
The following changes are made to the regulation for the 2002 season:

Sporting regulations
 The name '500cc', which was already used formally since 2000 on promotional material, is now officially changed to 'MotoGP'.
 All riders in the new MotoGP class must possess an FIM Grand Prix Super License.
 The maximum age of new riders to participate in the 125cc class has been set at the new standard of 25 years. This also counts for wildcard riders.
 It is now mandatory for manufacturers in all classes to own a FIM Manufacturers License.
 If a rider has been entered for participation of a 125cc or 250cc race, the team is not allowed to replace said rider after 17:30 on the first day of the event, which is Friday. An exception is made in the case of the MotoGP class where substitutions can be made up until 12:00 on the second day of the event, which is Saturday.
 In case of a home grand prix, each grand prix host federation (FMNR) may enter three wildcard riders for the 125cc and 250cc classes.
 The MSMA can also nominate one wildcard entry for the 250cc and MotoGP classes at all given races.
 The FIM may nominate two wildcard entries for the 125cc and 250cc classes as well.
 Dorna, together with the FIM, can nominate one wildcard entry for the MotoGP class at all races.
 The timetable for qualifying has been changed: The start time for the 125cc has gone from 13:15 to 13:45, the start time for the MotoGP has gone from 14:00 to 15:00 and the 250cc start time has gone from 15:15 to 16:00.
 Restrictions are imposed on the practice sessions. If there is a break in the championship that lasts two or more consecutive weekends, the testing exceptions will not apply from 09:00 that Wednesday until the start of the following race. The winter testing for the 125cc and 250cc teams will either be restricted to their own continental zones or official IRTA tests.
 Starter engines may now also be used on the grid. The number of people for each rider on the grid has been set to seven in the MotoGP class and to a maximum of two, three minutes before the start of a race.
 Riders will only be permitted to start the race from their assigned grid position if they complete at least one sighting lap. It is forbidden for anyone, even the rider, to push the motorcycle onto the grid from the pit lane.
 Riders are allowed to complete more than one sighting lap via the pit lane if they make any changes on their main bike, swap bikes or have to refuel.
 Riders who fail to complete at least one sighting lap will have to start the warm-up lap at the back of the grid from the pits under instructions of a marshal who is positioned at the pitlane exit. These riders are not allowed to have any tyre warmers on and cannot change wheels after the display of the "3 minutes" board.
 In case of two or more riders starting from the back of the grid, they will line up in the order of which they qualified during the Saturday qualification.
 It's forbidden to communicate anything between a moving motorcycle and anyone who is connected to the motorcycle's rider. Exceptions are made for the signal from the timekeeping transponder, the on-board camera's or the voice communication between the rider and team.
 All teams will from this season onwards compete for a MotoGP Team Championship and all teams will be consisting out of two riders. The names of the teams will consist out of multiple elements. The first one is the name of the manufacturers of the motorcycle or engines, which is mandatory. The second one is the name of the team, which is mandatory except when the team name is the same as the manufacturer name. The third is the name of the main sponsor, which is optional. All the points which are scored by both riders in the team, including the substitute or replacement riders, will count towards the team's constructors championship. If the team consists out of only one rider, the points by said rider will also count. An exception is made for wild card entries, which do not score any points.
 In case of an entry, a rider is considered to have taken part the race weekend if he has, at least, participated in one practice session. A rider is considered to have started a race if he, at least, participates in the first lap.
 For a rider to be classified as a finisher of the race and be included in the final results, he must cross the finish line on the circuit and not in the pitlane within five minutes of the race winner. The rider must, at all times, be in contact with his motorcycle also.
 The white line which indicates the pole position must be painted one meter before the start/finish line.
 From 1 January 2003 onwards, races which have changes in the climate because of rain or mixed conditions and have thus changes in adhesion of the circuit, will no longer be stopped.

Technical regulations
 The 500cc two-stroke machines - in use since the late 1970s - are going to be phased out this season for the new 990cc four-stroke machines.
 Helmets must now conform to one of the recognized international standards and be of the full face type. The European standards are ECE 22-04 & ECE 22-05 'p', the British standards are BS 6658 Grade A and the American standards are USA: DOT Federal Standard n? 218/SNELL M95 & M2000.
 The use of materials has been restricted. The basic structure of the crankshaft and camshafts must be created from either steel or cast iron. It is not allowed to use composite structures which use either carbon or aramid fiber reinforcing material on components such as pistons, cylinder heads and cylinder blocks. It is mandatory to have brake calipers which are made from aluminium material with a modulus of elasticity that does not exceed the 80 GPA. None of the parts on the bike can be made from metallic materials which have a specific elasticity modus that is greater than 50 GPA.

2002 Grand Prix season results

 †† = Saturday Race

Participants

MotoGP participants
FIM released a 20-rider entry list on 13 March 2002. Àlex Crivillé, who was listed on the entry list, was replaced by Pere Riba at the Antena 3 Yamaha d'Antin team before the start of the season.

250cc participants
The FIM released a 25-rider entry list on 13 March 2002. Alex Hofmann, who was listed on the entry list, withdrew before the start of the season.

Notes

 * denotes riders who raced for more than one team during the season.

125cc participants
FIM released a 33-rider entry list on 13 March 2002. 

Notes

 * denotes riders who raced for more than one team during the season.

Standings

MotoGP riders' standings

Scoring system
Points were awarded to the top fifteen finishers. A rider had to finish the race to earn points.

 Rounds marked with a light blue background were under wet race conditions or stopped by rain.
 Riders marked with light blue background were eligible for Rookie of the Year awards.

250cc riders' standings

Scoring system
Points were awarded to the top fifteen finishers. A rider had to finish the race to earn points.

 Rounds marked with a light blue background were under wet race conditions or stopped by rain.
 Riders marked with light blue background were eligible for Rookie of the Year awards.

125cc riders' standings
Scoring system
Points were awarded to the top fifteen finishers. A rider had to finish the race to earn points.

 Rounds marked with a light blue background were under wet race conditions or stopped by rain.
 Riders marked with light blue background were eligible for Rookie of the Year awards.

Constructors' standings
Scoring system
Points were awarded to the top fifteen finishers. A rider had to finish the race to earn points.
 

 Each constructor gets the same number of points as their best placed rider in each race.
 Rounds marked with a light blue background were under wet race conditions or stopped by rain.

MotoGP

250cc

125cc

Teams' standings
 Each team gets the total points scored by their two riders, including replacement riders. In one rider team, only the points scored by that rider will be counted. Wildcard riders do not score points.
 Rounds marked with a light blue background were under wet race conditions or stopped by rain.

MotoGP

References

Sources

External links
Results and Statistics at MotoGP.com

Grand Prix Motorcycle Racing Season, 2002
Grand Prix motorcycle racing seasons
MotoGP racing season